Cideng is a village in the Gambir district of Jakarta. It has a postal code of 10150.

See also
 List of administrative villages of Jakarta

Gambir, Jakarta
Administrative villages in Jakarta